Kennecott Utah Copper LLC’s Garfield Smelter Stack is a  high smokestack west of Magna, Utah, alongside Interstate 80 near the Great Salt Lake. It was built to disperse exhaust gases from the Kennecott Utah Copper smelter at Garfield, Utah.

Waste gases

The extra height was needed to meet the requirements of the Clean Air Act of 1970, to disperse waste gases according to new standards. 

In response to new emissions limits and anticipated future state and federal standards, Outokumpu and Kennecott had conducted flash converting pilot tests from 1985 at Outokumpu's research facility in Finland. In 1995 a new, cleaner  flash smelting furnace was commissioned. By 2004, the annual average SO2 emissions from the stack were 161.5 lb/h (73 kg/h), below the permitted average annual level of 211 lb/h (96 kg/h) (with a three-hour permitted SO2 limit of 552 lb/h (250 kg/h)).

The off-gases from the flash smelting furnace contain 35-40% sulfur dioxide. They are cooled and cleaned in a waste-heat boiler, electrostatic precipitator and scrubbing system before being sent to the sulfuric acid plant. The acid plant produces either 94% or 98% sulfuric acid with tail gas containing typically 50-70 ppm sulfur dioxide, resulting in a measured sulfur fixation of greater than 99.9%. The acid recovery plant is designed to also recover waste heat from the process to produce electrical power. Approximately 24 MW of electrical power is generated, representing 70% of the smelter’s electrical requirements.

Design and construction

A large fiberglass duct passes up the stack and carries gases to the top.  

Construction commenced on August 26, 1974 and finished on November 19, an 84-day concrete pour. It cost $16.3 million at the time to build, the equivalent of $78.7 million in 2015 dollars. 

The top can be accessed by a Swedish-built elevator that crawls up a gear track on the inside surface. It takes 20 minutes to ascend the stack, although workers only need to travel up to the 300-foot level each day, to service the air-sampling station.

The Garfield Smelter Stack is the tallest free-standing structure west of the Mississippi River, the fourth tallest smokestack in the world and the fifty-ninth tallest free-standing structure on earth. It is the only operating smelter chimney left in Utah.

See also

 List of chimneys
 List of tallest freestanding structures in the world

References

External links

 Kennecott Utah Copper
 A comparison with other large stacks of the world can be seen at skyscraperpage

Buildings and structures in Salt Lake County, Utah
Chimneys in the United States
Towers completed in 1974
Towers in Utah
1974 establishments in Utah